Malevolent Creation is an American death metal band formed in Buffalo, New York in 1987 and later based in Fort Lauderdale, Florida. The band's original members were rhythm guitarist Phil Fasciana, vocalist Brett Hoffmann, lead guitarist Jim Nickles, bassist Jason Blachowicz and drummer Dennis Kubas. Fasciana is the only founding member who stayed with the band consistently.

The band moved to Fort Lauderdale a year after it formed, and they became a part of the emergent local death metal scene, landing a deal with Roadrunner Records and helping to develop the Florida death metal sound. In 1991 their debut album, The Ten Commandments, became something of a landmark in the death metal underground, expanding on the early work of bands such as Slayer, Kreator, Possessed, Onslaught, Obituary, and Death.

History 
Malevolent Creation signed a management deal with Extreme Management Group (Suffocation, Origin) in 2010 and announced April 5, 2010, as the starting date for recording their next album with Erik Rutan at Mana Recording Studios (Cannibal Corpse, Vital Remains, Goatwhore, etc.) The band released the following statement:

"After over 20 years in existence, and now having the most solid line up in years, we really wanted to make sure that with this new album we elevated the band in every way. Getting good management was crucial and EMG has a great track record. Erik has been talking to us since Doomsday X to record us, and with Gus Rios (Drums) being in the band full time now, we didn't want him to have the responsibility of producing the album as well as writing and playing. Erik really understands what we are about, and has all of the same thoughts about recording as us. It really couldn't be a better working situation. We've said it before but this album really is without a doubt is the most relentless, focused and brutal MALEVOLENT CREATION album ever! We really went back to our roots, not only as a band, but as fans of metal. We wrote an album of songs that we as fans of brutal music would want to hear."

Malevolent Creation signed a worldwide record deal with Century Media Records in 2014. Their 12th studio album, Dead Man's Path, was released in October 2015. In September 2016, it was reported that the band had broke up following the cancellation of their upcoming U.S. tour, and departure of their long-time bassist Jason Blachowicz. Phil Fasciana is the only remaining member left.

In November 2017, it was announced that Malevolent Creation had returned with a new lineup, and an upcoming album to be released next year.

Original vocalist Bret Hoffmann died from colon cancer on July 7, 2018, at the age of 51.

In October 2022, former CKY frontman Deron Miller joined the band as the new vocalist and guitarist.

Controversies 
On the album Eternal, the song "They Breed" features a prominent racial slur focused towards black people. This has led to the reputation of the band being known as an act full of racists. However, according to many members of the band, they claimed the only individual with racist tendencies was bassist and vocalist Jason Blachowicz, who wrote the lyrics to "They Breed". Former drummer Alex Marquez also stated that Blachowicz was the only member of the band who was racist, also highlighting his ethnicity of Cuban descent to show that the band as a whole was not racist. In 2007, guitarist Phil Fasciana was interviewed by Grimoire of Exalted Deeds magazine, and uttered many racial slurs throughout the interview.  This interview was shared publicly by zine Metal Sucks years later, in 2014, and in response, Bill Zebub of Exalted Deeds claimed it was a joke and hilarious. However, according to later vocalist Lee Wollenschlaeger, the interview conducted by Exalted Deeds was a fraudulent and a false interview. In 2014, the band made headlines once more when former drummer Gus Rios departed and Fasciana referred to him as "Gay Gus". He recanted the statement, as he claims no ill-will towards Rios and that he was simply referring to a nickname of Rios' since before they met.

Members 

Current members
Phil Fasciana – rhythm guitar 
Josh Gibbs – bass 
Ronnie Parmer – drums 
Deron Miller – lead guitar, vocals

Discography

Studio albums 
The Ten Commandments (1991)
Retribution (1992)
Stillborn (1993)
Eternal (1995)
In Cold Blood (1997)
The Fine Art of Murder (1998)
Envenomed (2000)
The Will to Kill (2002)
Warkult (2004)
Doomsday X (2007)
Invidious Dominion (2010)
Dead Man's Path (2015)
The 13th Beast (2019)

Live albums 
Conquering South America (2004)
Live at the Whiskey (2008)
Australian Onslaught (2010)

Compilations 
At Death's Door II "Piece by Piece" (Slayer Cover) (Roadrunner, 2009)
Joe Black (Pavement Music, 1996)
Manifestation – Compilation (Pavement Music, 2000)
The Best of Malevolent Creation (Roadrunner, 2003)
Retrospective (Crash Music, 2005)
Essentials (Crash Music, 2009)

DVD 
Lost Commandments (Massacre Records, 2008) – It was an Arctic Music release that was licensed to Massacre Records for European release

Music videos 
Slaughter House (2010)
Target Rich Environment (2012)
Decimated (2018)
Release the Soul (2019)

References

External links 
 Malevolent Creation @ Band interview

1987 establishments in New York (state)
Century Media Records artists
Death metal musical groups from Florida
Death metal musical groups from New York (state)
Musical groups established in 1987
Musical groups from Fort Lauderdale, Florida
Musical quartets